Sesommata paraplatysaris is a moth of the family Palaephatidae. It was described by Davis in 1986. It is found in the montane, temperate forests of southern Argentina and Chile.

The length of the forewings is 5-6.2 mm for males and 5-6.5 mm for females. Adult males have dark fuscous forewings, lightly irrorated with white apically, and with a rounded mass of broad sex scales. The forewings of the females are more brown, irrorated with white scales, the costal margin usually with two cream spots the beyond middle. Adults are on wing from November to January in one generation per year.

Etymology
The species name is derived from Greek para (meaning near or close) as a prefix to the name of the species, Sesommata platysaris, to indicate the close affinities of these two species.

References

Moths described in 1986
Palaephatidae